John Derek Stubbs (3 September 1952 – 16 August 2021) was the dean of studies of the Anglican Church of Southern Africa from 1991 until 1999, and thereafter he was the dean and archdeacon of Grahamstown, from 1999 until 2006. Prior to that, Stubbs worked as a priest at the Church of the Heavenly Rest, in New York City, U.S.

Stubbs matriculated at King Edward VII School (known as 'KES'), in Johannesburg, South Africa. After matriculating, Stubbs studied engineering, before being called to serve the Anglican and Episcopalian Church first as a lay youth leader and eventually as a priest.

Stubbs was forced to relocate to the United States of America in 1980, as a result of the apartheid laws that applied in South Africa at the time which criminalized his marriage to Nommso Ngodongwana. He was detained for anti-apartheid activities at the infamous 'Old Fort' prison (in which Nelson Mandela and Mahatma Gandhi, among many others, were prisoners), which is now the site of South Africa's highest appellate court. Whilst Stubbs was in the U.S., he obtained degrees from the General Theological Seminary and Union Theological Seminary in New York, U.S.

Stubbs was ordained as an Anglican priest by Archbishop Desmond Tutu in 1984, under whom he would later serve in the Anglican Church of Southern Africa.  He returned to South Africa in 1991. Whilst working as dean and archdeacon of Cape Town and Grahamstown, respectively, he obtained a Ph.D. from the University of South Africa.

Stubbs had a working proficiency in Hebrew and Ancient Greek, among other languages. He returned to the U.S. after his second stint in South Africa, where he became the Incumbent Rector at Trinity Episcopal Church, Whitinsville, Massachusetts. He retired from there. He died on August 16, 2021 and was honored by a memorial service at Grahamstown Cathedral

References

University of South Africa alumni
Deans of Grahamstown
Living people
1952 births